Sheikh Khalid bin Ahmad Al Qasimi was the Ruler of Sharjah, a Trucial State and now one of the United Arab Emirates, from 1914–1924 and Ras Al Khaimah from 1914–1921. He acceded on the death of Saqr bin Khalid Al Qasimi. His rule was tumultuous and unpopular, marked by internecine conflicts and public discontent and saw the final disintegration of the Al Qasimi's joint rule over Sharjah and Ras Al Khaimah. Deposed as Ruler of Sharjah in 1924, he went on to become ruler of Dhaid and Kalba (itself recognised by the British as a Trucial State) and a highly influential figure in the Shamaliyah (the east coast of the peninsula).

Accession 
Saqr bin Khalid Al Qasimi nominated his cousin, Khalid bin Ahmad, as his successor shortly before his death, as his own sons were still minors.

One of Khalid bin Ahmad's first acts on becoming Ruler of Sharjah was to settle the question of Jazirat Al Hamra. Home to some 500 houses of the Za'ab tribe (the Emirati family name Al Zaabi derives from the singular of Za'ab), Jazirat Al Hamra was normally regarded as a dependency of Ras Al Khaimah (although it was frequently an unwilling one) and Khalid confirmed this in a formal division of dependencies between the two emirates.

In 1919, Khalid bin Ahmad appointed his brother Rashid bin Ahmad as wali of Dibba, which led to a prolonged dispute over the fiefdom after Khalid was deposed as Ruler of Sharjah in 1924.

Loss of Ras Al Khaimah 
Khalid bin Ahmad's rule was characterised by a number of challenges, not the least of which was losing Ras Al Khaimah as a dependency. He had inherited a problematic situation in Ras Al Khaimah, where Salim bin Sultan Al Qasimi, the former Ruler of Sharjah and, briefly, Ras Al Khaimah, had established virtual independence. Salim's son son Muhammad took over the leadership role in Ras Al Khaimah after Salim became paralysed and then, in July 1919 renounced his position in favour of his brother, Sultan. Salim died in August 1919, leaving Sultan as a leader in his place.

The British were initially reluctant to recognise Sultan bin Salim as a Trucial Sheikh (and therefore independent from Khalid bin Ahmad) as they believed his tenure would be short-lived. However, on 7 June 1921, he was confirmed as such by the British Political Resident. Khalid's impotence in the face of this act was striking, as was his weakness at managing the rebellious headman of Heera, Abdulrahman bin Muhammad Al Shamsi.

In June 1920, Abdulrahman seized the fort of Ajman and was only removed after the intercession of the British Residency Agent. Khalid bin Ahmed raised a force, together with Humaid bin Abdulaziz Al Nuaimi of Ajman and together they attacked Abdulrahman in Heera. Again, the British intervened and an agreement was made that recognised Abdulrahman as a subject of Khalid's and bound him to cause no further trouble. This annoyed Humaid bin Abdulaziz of Ajman who gained nothing by it.

In early 1922, along with the other Trucial Sheikhs, Khalid signed an agreement with the British that any oil concessions would be granted only to a British government appointee. However, no such concession was signed during his rule. He also entered into an agreement with the headman of Hamriyah to grant the town independence, signed in the presence of the British Resident Agent (to the fury of the Political Resident in Bushire) on 9 August 1923. Khalid's successor considered the agreement void.

Deposed as Ruler of Sharjah 
Sultan bin Saqr Al Qasimi, Saqr bin Khalid's son, petitioned Khalid for the restitution of property and money that Khalid had seized on assuming power, but in vain. Embittered, he left Sharjah in 1921 and settled in Dubai.

In 1923, he married the daughter of Abdulrahman bin Muhammad Al Shamsi. Khalid bin Ahmad took this as a challenge and once again moved against Abdulrahman at Heera, but Abdulrahman appealed to the Residency Agent who negotiated a peace and put two of his own men to guard the fort at Heera. Khalid then appointed a wali over Heera, who, Abdulrahman arrested. Khalid then moved against Heera, which Abdulrahman now prepared to defend against a combined force from Sharjah and Ajman. Another British intervention followed and Abdulrahman went to Dubai to join his son-in-law.

By now, the people of Sharjah had enough. Khalid was unpopular and was seen as weak, having lost Ras Al Khaimah and oppressed Heera. His actions toward Sultan, the son of the former ruler, were widely deprecated and his taxes and levies were resented. On 1 November 1924, Sultan bin Saqr was welcomed into Sharjah and deposed Khalid in a brief, 11-day conflict. Khalid took refuge in Dubai and then Umm Al Qawain.

Ruler of Dhaid 
Although removed as Ruler of Sharjah, Khalid had considerable influence over Sharjah's eastern dependencies, Dhaid, Dibba and Kalba. On taking control of Sharjah, Sultan bin Saqr removed Khalid's brother Rashid bin Ahmed as wali of Dibba. However, he was restored in 1926 after leading a popular revolt and remained as wali until his death in 1937.

In June 1927, an agreement was reached between Sultan bin Saqr and Khalid bin Ahmad to provide for the upkeep of the deposed ruler's family. This ceded the fort at Dhaid and the revenues of the inland oasis town to Khalid bin Ahmad. Dhaid, in 1906, generated some 228 Marie Theresa Dollars annually in water rates, as well as revenue from the sale of dates.

Although he had Sultan bin Saqr's agreement, Khalid remained in Umm Al Qawain and sent some of his men to Dhaid to occupy his newly acquired property as the Bedouin who had manned the fort for Sultan were still active in the area. With the support of the Sheikhs of the Bedouin Bani Ka'ab and Na'im tribes, who favoured any scheme which would weaken Sharjah, it was agreed that the ruler of Ras Al Khaimah, Sultan bin Salim Al Qasimi, would possess Dhaid 'on behalf of Khaled bin Ahmad'. This arrangement was not fully supported by Sultan bin Salim himself, who feared antagonising Sultan bin Saqr and also believed Khalid bin Ahmad would represent an ongoing financial burden with little hope of any return other than conflict.

Khalid bin Ahmad finally took full possession of Dhaid in his own right in July 1928.

Ruler of Kalba 
In April 1937, Khalid bin Ahmad married Aisha, the daughter of the former wali but now Ruler of Kalba, Sheikh Said bin Hamad Al Qasimi. Said bin Hamad had been recognised as a Trucial Sheikh by the British in 1936 in return for his agreement to confer landing rights for a backup airstrip to support the Imperial Airways airfield in Sharjah. Said bin Hamad died suddenly at the end of April 1937 while visiting Khor Fakkan. Said bin Hamad's son, Hamad, was still a minor and therefore Aisha moved quickly to establish a regency, travelling to Kalba and organising the town's defences. For many years Said bin Hamad had lived in Ajman and entrusted a slave by the name of Barut to manage Kalba on his behalf and Aisha now arranged for Barut to once again take charge as Wali. She sent a message to Khalid bin Ahmad, who was in Ras Al Khaimah at the time.

A period of intense political infighting and negotiation between the many involved parties now followed. In June 1937, the notable residents of Kalba selected the slave Barut as Regent for the 12-year-old Hamad, but this solution was not accepted by the British and Khalid bin Ahmad was selected as regent. Khalid was increasingly seen as an influential and unifying figure by the Bedouin and the townspeople of the East Coast, to the point where his old foe, Sultan bin Saqr of Sharjah, was forced to ask Khalid bin Ahmad for help in pacifying the tribes of the interior, particularly the Bani Qitab, paying Khalid 1,500 Rupees for his intercession.

Khalid ruled over Dhaid and Kalba (delegating his rule in Kalba to Barut and choosing himself to live in Dhaid and Heera) until 1950, when he was too old and infirm to take a further role in affairs. He died that year.

References 

Sheikhs of the Emirate of Sharjah
House of Al Qasimi
19th-century monarchs in the Middle East
History of the United Arab Emirates
Sheikhs of the Emirate of Ras Al Khaimah
20th-century Arabs